Brozolo is a comune (municipality) in the Metropolitan City of Turin in the Italian region Piedmont, located about  east of Turin.

Brozolo borders the following municipalities: Verrua Savoia, Brusasco, Moransengo, Robella, and Cocconato.

References

Cities and towns in Piedmont